= Quincy Tarter =

American politician (1910–1993)

Member of the Wyoming House of Representatives
- In office 1977–1982

Personal details
- Born: July 4, 1910 Muncie, Indiana, U.S.
- Died: September 15, 1993 (aged 83)
- Party: Republican
- Spouse: Lois Giles (m. 1938)
- Education: University of Wyoming

Quincy Tarter (July 4, 1910 – September 15, 1993) was an American politician. He served as a Republican member of the Wyoming House of Representatives.

== Life and career ==
Tarter was born in Muncie, Indiana. He attended Lovell High School and the University of Wyoming.

Tarter was principal of Dean Morgan Junior High School during the 1950s.

Tarter served in the Wyoming House of Representatives from 1977 to 1983.

Tarter died on September 15, 1993, at the age of 83.
